Laurence Deonna (born 1937) is a Swiss journalist, writer and photographer who in the late 1960s became a celebrated war reporter in the Middle-East. In 1987, on the basis of her articles, books and photographs promoting international understanding and improvements to the status of women, she was awarded the UNESCO Prize for Peace Education. Deonna, who continues to write, has published 12 widely translated books.

Biography
Born in 1937 in Geneva, Laurence Deonna is the daughter of the economist and politician Raymond Deonna, who headed the board of the former Journal de Genève, and his wife Anne-Marie Vernet-Faesch. She left school before matriculating, attended art school in London and returned to Geneva to work in an art gallery. She was married for a short period between 1961 and 1963.

In 1967, invited to report on the Six-Day War, she embarked on a long career as a journalist in the Middle-East, where she took a special interest in the lives of Arab women. Realizing that books offered a more lasting way than newspapers of covering countries in depth, she went on to publish many lengthy accounts of her trips abroad over the next 40 years. They were frequently illustrated with her photographs.

Her works not only focus on women but reveal her firm conviction that many of the world's problems could be solved if greater concern was devoted to achieving peace. As a result, in 1989 she was awarded the UNESCO Prize for Peace Education. In Switzerland, she was a strong proponent of the 1989 (unsuccessful) referendum to abolish the Swiss army. Her role as a feminist can be seen from the central place she gives to women in all her writings.

Selected works

Moyen-Orient – femmes du combat, de la terre et du sable, Labor et Fides, Geneva, 1970.
Le Yémen que j’ai vu, 24 Heures, Lausanne, 1982.
Yémen. Arthaud, Paris, 1983.
La guerre à deux voix. Témoignages de "femmes ennemies", Le Centurion, Paris / Labor et Fides, Geneva 1986
Syriens, Syriennes (1992-1994), Zoé, Geneva, 1986.
Persianeries - Reportages dans l’Iran des mollahs (1985-1998), Zoé, Genève, 1998.
Kazakhstan – Bourlinguer en Asie centrale post-communiste, Zoé, Geneva 2001

In English
On Persian roads: glimpses of revolutionary Iran, 1985-1998, Pueblo, Colo, Passeggiata Press, 1999. 
Syrians : a travelogue (1992-1994), Pueblo, Colo, Passeggiata Press, 1997. 
Yemen. Boulder, Colo, Three Continents Press, 1991. 
Travels through Kazakhstan : after the fall of the Soviet Empire, London, Athena Press, 2010.

References

1937 births
Living people
Writers from Geneva
Swiss women photographers
20th-century Swiss photographers
Swiss women journalists
20th-century Swiss journalists
Swiss writers in French
21st-century Swiss photographers
21st-century Swiss journalists
21st-century Swiss women writers
Swiss pacifists
Swiss feminists
20th-century women photographers
21st-century women photographers
Photographers from Geneva